Erik Alcock (born 1983) is a Canadian songwriter, composer and musician. He is a frequent collaborator with DJ Khalil, with whom he has written and played on two Grammy Award-winning albums (Eminem's Recovery and The Marshall Mathers LP 2, both of which won Best Rap Album), as well as P!nk's Grammy-nominated album The Truth About Love. He has also written music for Celine Dion, Pitbull, Tyga, Royce da 5'9", Professor Green and Guess Who.

Personal life 
Alcock was born in Toronto, Ontario, Canada. In 2016, he relocated to Los Angeles and now resides in Berlin, Germany.

References 

1983 births
Living people
Canadian male songwriters